Lift Up the Lord is the fourth studio album by Christian singer Sandi Patti, released in 1982 on Impact Records. The track "How Majestic Is Your Name" is written by up and coming singer/songwriter Michael W. Smith and it has become one of Patti's signature songs and has been often performed in her concerts. In 1983, the album was named Inspirational Album of the Year at the 14th GMA Dove Awards and was nominated for Best Gospel Performance, Contemporary or Inspirational at the 25th Grammy Awards. Benson Records re-issued Lift Up the Lord on CD in 1987 with a new cover featuring an updated photo of Patti. Word Records would use the same cover for their re-issue in 1990. In 1984, Lift Up the Lord peaked at No. 12 on the Top Christian Albums chart.

Track listing

Note: On track 8, the title would later change to "Yes, God Is Real" on the 1987 Benson Records re-issue and again in 1990 on the Word Records re-issue.

Charts

Radio singles

Accolades
GMA Dove Awards
1983 Female Vocalist of the Year

References

1982 albums
Sandi Patty albums
Impact Records albums
Word Records albums